Riteish Vilasrao Deshmukh (born 17 December 1978) is an Indian actor, television presenter, producer, screenwriter and filmmaker who works in Hindi and Marathi cinema. He is the son of politician Vilasrao Deshmukh.

Deshmukh began his acting career with the film Tujhe Meri Kasam (2003) and since then he has worked in several successful films such as Masti (2004), Kyaa Kool Hai Hum (2005), Bluffmaster! (2005), Malamaal Weekly (2006), Heyy Babyy (2007), Dhamaal (2007), Housefull (2010), Double Dhamaal (2011), Housefull 2 (2012), Kyaa Super Kool Hain Hum (2012), Grand Masti (2013), Housefull 3 (2016), Total Dhamaal (2019), Housefull 4 (2019) and Baaghi 3 (2020). He received widespread critical acclaim for playing a serial killer in the romantic thriller Ek Villain (2014). 

In Marathi cinema, he debuted as a producer with Balak-Palak (2013), made his Marathi acting debut with action film Lai Bhaari (2014) and made his directorial debut with Ved (2022).

Deshmukh is the board member of Mumbai Academy of the Moving Image.

Early life and family 
Deshmukh was born on 17 December 1978, in Mumbai to former chief minister of Maharashtra and Union Minister of Heavy Industries & Public Enterprises India, Vilasrao Deshmukh and Vaishali Deshmukh. His elder brother, Amit Deshmukh, is a MLA from Latur City and his younger brother, Dhiraj Deshmukh, is a MLA from Latur Rural. His elder sister-in-law Aditi Deshmukh is an actress and younger sister-in-law Deepshikha Deshmukh is a film producer.

Deshmukh studied at G. D. Somani Memorial School and earned an architectural degree from Kamla Raheja College of Architecture, Mumbai. He practiced for a year with an overseas architectural firm. He continued designing since his return to India. Deshmukh maintains an ownership in Evolutions, an India-based architectural and interior designing firm.

Career 

Deshmukh made his Hindi film debut with the 2003 romance, Tujhe Meri Kasam opposite Genelia D'Souza. He later appeared in Out of Control. In his third film, Masti, a comic thriller, his role was widely disparaged. Regardless, the film performed well at the box office. He gained fame after his performance in Masti, which earned him two minor awards. He subsequently appeared Bardaasht and Naach, both of them being box-office duds. His first relatively successful lead role occurred in the widely panned sex-comedy Kyaa Kool Hai Hum with Tusshar Kapoor. While the film was reviled by critics, it was appreciated by audiences and declared a moderate success at the box office. Deshmukh, by now had earned a strong foothold in the Bollywood film industry via his comic roles.

He appeared in Malamaal Weekly and Apna Sapna Money Money apart from Bluffmaster! with Abhishek Bachchan in the lead. He was seen in guest roles in Ram Gopal Varma's Darna Zaroori Hai, and then Namastey London, which was a box office hit. In 2007, Cash followed. Later that year, he appeared in Sajid Khan's directorial debut Heyy Babyy, co-starring Akshay Kumar and Fardeen Khan, which was a huge hit. He appeared in the comedy film Dhamaal.

In 2008, he played a lead role in De Taali, in which his performance was praised, and later in Chamku, both of which performed poorly at the box office.

In 2009, his first release was Aladin, co-starring Amitabh Bachchan, Sanjay Dutt and Jacqueline Fernandez. He was in the multi-starcast, Aladin. He then played a supporting role in Ram Gopal Varma's Rann, again co-starring Amitabh Bachchan, Paresh Rawal and Rajpal Yadav. His final film of 2009 was Do Knot Disturb with Govinda, Sushmita Sen, Sohail Khan and Lara Dutta.

In 2010, he worked with Sajid Khan on the comedy Housefull with Akshay Kumar, Deepika Padukone, Lara Dutta, Arjun Rampal and Jiah Khan. The film received negative response from critics, though it performed well commercially. His first release of 2011 was F.A.L.T.U., in which he played the role of Bajirao, a fake college principal. His second release of the year was the comic sequel Double Dhamaal. Both were above-average grossers and very successful.

In 2012, he first appeared in Tere Naal Love Ho Gaya in which he is paired opposite his real wife Genelia D'Souza. It proved a commercial hit despite being a shoestring budget. He then starred in a sequel, Housefull 2, which released on 6 April 2012 and was a huge success like its predecessor. Housefull 2 has been marked as Ritesh's biggest success to date. His last release of the year and his latest film was sequel Kyaa Super Kool Hain Hum, which released on 27 July 2012.

Deshmukh then starred in another sequel, this time to the 2004 hit Masti titled Grand Masti which released in September 2013 and became a box office success, despite receiving negative reviews. Deshmukh made his debut as a film producer with the Marathi film Balak Palak, directed by Ravi Jadhav, which released on 4 January 2013. Deshmukh has decided to make a Hindi remake of the film.

In 2014, Deshmukh appeared in 2 completely different roles; first in the romance-comedy film Humshakals, which was a box office failure and then in the romance-thriller Ek Villain. With Ek Villain, Deshmukh played the antagonist for the first time in his career. Ek Villain was a box office success and he received many awards for acting. Besides this, he also made his acting debut in Marathi cinema the same year with the action film Lai Bhaari. He did a small cameo in Entertainment, which was not entertaining at the box office.

In 2015, he appeared in Bangistan along with Pulkit Samrat. The film was a comedy-satire and received a mixed critical response. However, was a box office disaster.

In 2016, he appeared in the third installment of the Housefull and Masti series Housefull 3 and Great Grand Masti and a musical drama Banjo. He appeared in the comedy film Bank Chor which was released in 2017 and in the end of 2018, he did his second Marathi film MAULI which was a box office success. In 2019 he appeared in a third part of Dhamaal called Total Dhamaal which received mixed reviews still it becomes successful. In the same year he appeared in two other movies Housefull 4 and Marjaavaan (as a villain after Ek Villain),  both were received mixed reviews but they were successful at box office. Housefull 4 become his biggest hit till date and his acting in Marjaavaan was appreciated.

In 2020, he appeared in Baaghi 3 with Tiger Shroff and Shradhha Kapoor.

In 2022, Deshmukh made his directorial debut with Marathi language Romantic drama film Ved in which he co-starred his wife Genelia D'Souza. It was the remake of  2019 Telugu-language film Majili written and directed by Shiva Nirvana. It was released on 30th December 2022 to positive reviews from critics and audience. Shubham Kulkarni reviewing the film for  Koimoi, rated it with two and a half stars and criticised the predictability of narrative writing, "Ved has good things laced with predictability and that kills the vibe." Kulkarni opined that debutant director has shot the songs well writing, "He [the director] blends the music, story, and performances so well." Kulkarni felt that Deshmukh "has a director in him but, he is too bud completely yet." Soham Godbole writing for Loksatta praised the acting of ensemble, cinematography and the music, writing, "The best aspects of the film are the cinematography combined with Ajay Atul's music, [which] takes the film to greater heights." Concluding, Godbole opined, "This movie is sure to be a treat for those who are madly in love and those who love madly."
Mihir Bhanage reviewing the film for The Times of India rated it with 3 stars out of 5 and wrote, "Ved is a quintessential romantic drama" that "has been shot aesthetically." Bhanage praised the music, writing "The music by Ajay-Atul is good.".

Personal life 

Tabloids repeatedly linked Deshmukh romantically with Genelia D'Souza, ever since they starred together in their debut film Tujhe Meri Kasam in 2003. They were reportedly ready to get engaged, but Ritesh's father, the then–Maharashtra Chief Minister, Vilasrao Deshmukh did not agree. D'Souza later denied any rumors of a relationship with Deshmukh, and responds that she was just friends with him. However, the couple eventually got married on 3 February 2012, according to Marathi marriage traditions in a Hindu wedding ceremony, they had a Christian wedding in the church on next day. The couple's first child, a son named Riaan, was born on 25 November 2014. Their second son, named Rahyl, was born on 1 June 2016.

Production and other work 
Deshmukh launched his own production house, Mumbai Film Company, in 2013 with the production of the Marathi film Balak Palak, which won several awards. He then produced another Marathi film Faster Fene, in 2017. 

Deshmukh turned director and screenwriter with the 2022 film Ved, which was produced by Genelia. It became the highest grossing Marathi film of 2022 and the third highest-grossing Marathi film of all-time.

In addition to this, he has hosted various award functions including International Indian Film Academy Awards and Zee Cine Awards. In 2013, he made his television debut as a Judge with India's Dancing Superstar. He has co-hosted the talk show Yaadon Ki Baaraat, the quiz show Vikta Ka Uttar. He made his web debut in 2021, co-hosting Ladies vs Gentlemen with Genelia D'souza.  Since 2022, he is seen as the Prosecuting Lawyer in Case Toh Banta Hai.

Off-screen work and media image 
In 2013, he formed a cricket team with Dhiraj Deshmukh, later named Veer Marathi in the Celebrity Cricket League. He played in this league as the captain of his team. Veer Marathi's brand ambassador was Genelia D'Souza. 
He was ranked third in The Times of India's Top 20 Most Desirable Men of Maharashtra in 2018.

The actor donated Rs 2.5 million to his hometown Latur for Jalyukta Latur', an initiative to provide sufficient water to the parched district after the droughts that Latur faced in April 2016. Riteish and Genelia donated Rs 2.5 million towards flood relief in Maharashtra during the 2019 Indian floods.

Filmography

Films

Television
Lego Ninjago: Masters of Spinjitzu, he voiced Jay (Blue Ninja) in the Hindi dubbing of this show along with Nachiket Dighe as the voice of Kai (Red Ninja), Akshay Kumar as the voice of Cole (Black Ninja), and Salman Khan as the voice of Sensei Wu (Wise teacher of the Ninja).

Awards and nominations

References

External links 

 
 
 Mister Mummy at Bollywood Hungama

Indian male film actors
People from Latur
People from Maharashtra
Marathi people
21st-century Indian male actors
Male actors in Hindi cinema
Lee Strasberg Theatre and Film Institute alumni
Living people
People from Marathwada
1977 births
Screen Awards winners
Zee Cine Awards winners
International Indian Film Academy Awards winners